Taché is a rural municipality in Manitoba, Canada, incorporated in 1880.

Named after the Bishop Taché (one of the first bishops in Manitoba), it is located to the south-east of Winnipeg, stretching from the Red River Floodway in the west to the beginning of the Canadian Shield in the east. Trees line the Seine River as it meanders through the centre of the municipality and acts as an oasis of oak and elm trees in the primarily agricultural fields of the area. Lorette and Landmark are the main residential and commercial hubs of the municipality with Ste-Genevieve, Dufresne, Ross, and Linden as other noteworthy communities.

In 1998 a new high school, Collège Lorette Collegiate, was completed in the town of Lorette. The town is also home to the municipal office and to the board offices of the Seine River School Division and the Franco-manitoban School Division.

As per Statistics Canada, Taché's population in 2016 was 11,568.

Communities
 Dufresne
 Landmark
 Linden
 Lorette
 Rosewood
 Ross
 Ste-Geneviève

Demographics 

The median worth of a dwelling is $319,779 in Taché, a bit lower than the provincial median at $275,473. The average household has 3.1 people. The median (after-tax) household income in the area is $79,026, quite higher than the provincial amount at $59,093. The median age of Taché is 34.8, significantly younger than then national median at 41.2 years old, and the provincial median at 38.3 years old.

The census also reports that 69.6% of the residents mother tongue was English, followed by; French (15.8%) and German (9.0%).

Taché is mostly inhabited by European descendants, however has a large Aboriginal population as well, particularly Métis people. It has the second largest Metis population ratio (second to Prince Albert, Saskatchewan) for any settlements with more than 10,000 residents, at 14.3%. The racial make up is:

Religiously speaking, most of the residents either practice a form of Christianity (71.4%) or have no religious affiliation at all (27.7%).

Water 
The R.M. of Taché operates water services out of two separate locations — Lorette and Landmark.

In 2005 the R.M. had issued a boil water advisory due to the poor quality of water coming from the well due to the well and infrastructure reaching end of life. In 2009 the R.M. had received approval to for a $5.3 million Lorette Water Supply Project, which included construction of a new well at Lorette, a 1 megalitre underground Reservoir, and new distribution infrastructure.

References

External links 
 
Manitoba Community Profiles: R. M. of Taché
Map of Taché R. M. at Statcan

Rural municipalities in Manitoba
Winnipeg Metro Region